Juliana Jay Harkavy (born January 1, 1985) is an American actress. She is known for portraying Rebecca in Dolphin Tale, Jessie in To Write Love on her Arms, and Alisha in the television series The Walking Dead. Her roles include a starring role in the horror film Last Shift, and a reprise of her role as Rebecca in Dolphin Tale 2. She was a series regular on The CW superhero series Arrow, portraying Dinah Drake / Black Canary.

Early life 
Harkavy was born in New York City. She is the daughter of Berta Carela, an immigrant from the Dominican Republic and Michael Harkavy, who is the former Senior Vice president of Warner Bros. Entertainment Worldwide Publishing, Kids' WB Music, and Warner Bros. Interactive Entertainment. Her professional acting career began when she was 10 years old. Harkavy has described herself as "a Dominican Jew".

Harkavy trained at the Young Actors Space in Sherman Oaks, California, for nine years. She attended her first year of high school at Le Lycée Français de Los Angeles, where she became fluent in French, and did part of her schooling in the South of France. She earned her high school diploma from the Milken Community High School in Los Angeles, California.After high school, Harkavy attended The Tisch School of the Arts at New York University, where she majored in Theater in the Sanford Meisner studio.

Career 
Harkavy's first acting job was at age 10 in a commercial for the Fox Kids series Goosebumps, based on the popular horror-book series. Her first role in a major motion picture was an uncredited role in the 1995 version of A Little Princess, directed by Alfonso Cuarón.

Harkavy starred in the 2011 film If You Only Knew about early-onset Alzheimer's disease. She stars as Jessica Loren in the horror film Last Shift.

Harkavy starred in the 2010 short film Whatever Lola Wants. Nominated for a Best Actress Award at the 2011 University of Miami Canes Film Festival
Harkavy is the star in the short film The Lost Doll directed by James Walhberg.

Harkavy plays Alisha, a survivor involved with the Governor on The Walking Dead. She appeared in two episodes: "Dead Weight" and "Too Far Gone".

In 2016 she was cast in the fifth season of the CW show Arrow, in the recurring role of Detective Tina Boland, whose true name is revealed to be Dinah Drake, acting as the new Black Canary. She was promoted to series regular for the show's sixth season, which began airing in the fall of 2017.

Personal life 

She has lived in New York, New Mexico, New Jersey, California, Florida, and France. On June 13, 2020, Harkavy announced that she was engaged to professional Setar player Alexander Meimand. They married on October 10, 2021.

Filmography

Film

Television

References

External links 

 
 
 
 
 

1985 births
20th-century American actresses
21st-century American actresses
Actresses from New York City
American child actresses
American film actresses
American television actresses
American people of African descent
American actresses of Chinese descent
American people of Dominican Republic descent
American people of Hungarian-Jewish descent
American people of Russian-Jewish descent
American Ashkenazi Jews
Living people
Tisch School of the Arts alumni